Jordan is a country with strong political support and a variety of locations that have been used by filmmakers from all over the world. Films that have been shot in Jordan include Indiana Jones and the Last Crusade which was filmed in Petra' in 1988.  Lawrence of Arabia directed by David Lean was filmed in the Wadi Rum desert in 1961. Recent films that were shot in Jordan are The Hurt Locker directed by Kathryn Bigelow, Redacted directed by Brian De Palma, some second unit scenes from Transformers: Revenge of the Fallen, Fair Game starring Sean Penn, and Battle for Haditha directed by Nick Broomfield.  Jordanian films such as Captain Abu Raed were also conceived and filmed in the country.

In 2003, Jordan developed the Royal Film Commission – Jordan to encourage filmmaking in the country and to train Jordanian filmmakers in the art of making cinema.  Before the RFC, the Amman Filmmakers Cooperative had been active in promoting digital filmmaking through free workshops in Amman and marginalized communities in Jordan. Films by the Amman Filmmakers Cooperative have been well received internationally and won numerous awards.

The commission was created to promote Jordan as a place where people from the Middle East can freely make films in collaboration with the world's most talented filmmakers.  Although Jordan lacks significant support services such as studios, labs and film equipment vendors, the country has recently been used to recreate many areas in the Middle East which might be too unpredictable to film in, such as Iraq, Afghanistan and the Palestinian territories.  Director Brian De Palma said that choosing Jordan to fill in for Iraq made sense; "The terrain is very similar to Iraq; plus they have close to a million Iraqi refugees there."

2007 was a big year for the Jordanian filmmaking community, with 10 feature films having been shot on location there, three of the films having been homegrown productions.

In 2008, Jordan created the Red Sea Institute of Cinematic Arts, a graduate school offering a Master of Fine Arts in Cinematic Arts.

In 2015, Jordan has received praise for its film called Theeb directed by Naji Abu Nowar which talks about the Ottoman province of Hijaz during World War I, when a young Bedouin boy experiences a greatly hastened coming of age as he embarks on a perilous desert journey to guide a British officer to his secret destination.  In January 2016, for the first time ever for Jordan, the film was nominated in the 88th Academy Awards for Best Foreign Language Film.

See also

 List of Jordanian films
 Cinema of the world

References